The Campaneyan Kriso Rai, also known as the Catholic Belltower, is a historic church tower in Garapan, the largest village on Saipan island in the Northern Mariana Islands. Built in 1932, it is the only element of the island's most prominent Roman Catholic church to survive bombardment in World War II.

The tower was listed on the National Register of Historic Places in 1984.

See also
National Register of Historic Places listings in the Northern Mariana Islands

References

Towers completed in 1932
Buildings and structures on the National Register of Historic Places in the Northern Mariana Islands
Buildings and structures in the Northern Mariana Islands
Buildings and structures in Saipan
Bell towers in the United States